The Prosperity Party is a political party in Ethiopia that was established on 1 December 2019 as a successor to the Ethiopian People's Revolutionary Democratic Front (EPRDF) by incumbent Prime Minister Abiy Ahmed. The merger into a countrywide party is part of Abiy's general policy of distancing the country's politics from ethnic federalism. It ran for the first time in the 2021 general election.

Composition
The Prosperity Party was formed and formally recognised by the National Electoral Board of Ethiopia (NEBE) in December 2019 through the merging of three former EPRDF member parties, the Amhara Democratic Party (ADP), the Oromo Democratic Party (ODP) and the Southern Ethiopian People's Democratic Movement (SEPDM). The Afar National Democratic Party (ANDP), the Benishangul-Gumuz People's Democratic Unity Front (BGPDUF), the Ethiopian Somali People's Democratic Party (ESPDP), the Gambela People's Democratic Movement (GPDM) and the Hareri National League (HNL) were also included in the merger. The Tigray People's Liberation Front (TPLF), the only one not to join the new party, was critical of it upon its formation. The animosity between the two eventually escalated into the Tigray conflict in November 2020.

Program
The program and by-laws of the party were first approved by the executive committee of the EPRDF. Abiy tweeted:

The Prosperity Party has been seen as supporters of Ethiopian civic nationalism due to the merger of the Oromo Democratic Party with the Amhara Democratic Party, Argoba People's Democratic Organization, Benishangul-Gumuz People's Democratic Unity Front, Ethiopian Somali People's Democratic Party, Gambela People's Democratic Movement, Afar National Democratic Party, Hareri National League, and the Southern Ethiopian People's Democratic Movement ethnicity-based political parties into the new multi-ethnic party, thus moving these predecessor parties away from their ethnic nationalist and pro-ethnic federalism past into a party that promotes a unified Ethiopian national identity and non-ethnicity based federalism — all of which are seen by opponents as steps towards taking political powers based on group rights away from the various ethnic groups, while proponents see it as a way to move Ethiopian politics and governmental administration away from ethnicity-based identity politics, supporting the individual rights of each person, to mitigate the rise of ethnic nationalism, to foster national unity and solidarity, and to include in the democratic process political parties of several ethnic groups and regions that were once deemed too inferior by the Tigray People's Liberation Front-led Ethiopian People's Revolutionary Democratic Front regime to fully join the one-party dominated coalition government or be full partakers in revolutionary democracy because of their largely pastoralist way of life.

Internal organisation and ethnic tensions within the party
The Prosperity Party (PP) exists along ethnic lines. There is an Amhara PP (APP), an Oromo PP (OPP), a Somali PP (SPP), a Sidama PP (SPP), and a Tigrayan PP, led by Nebiyou Shulmichael and of which Abraham Belay and Mulu Nega are prominent members. Many other ethnic groups have their own PP branch as well. There exists a substantial divide between the Oromo and Amhara wings of the party, with academic Tobias Hagmann noting that the two sides are largely kept together through opposition to the Tigray People's Liberation Front (TPLF).

The Tigrayan PP is in strong conflict with the TPLF as it is a supporter of Abiy Ahmed in the Tigray War (2020-2021). Due to this war, the Tigray PP has become isolated in Tigrayan public opinion to the point that one of the regional PP leaders, Abraham Belay, was forbidden by his own mother to visit her house and her neighbourhood. In March 2021, the Oromia Prosperity Party (OPP) and Amhara Prosperity Party (APP) came with opposite statements, each blaming the other for being the cause of violence and killings.

Symbols 
The party's logo consists of two black hands holding three human figures, one blue, one yellow, and one pink, with sun rays shooting outwards from the human figures.

References

2019 establishments in Ethiopia
Centrist parties in Africa
Ethiopian nationalism
Federalist parties in Ethiopia
Liberal parties in Ethiopia
Nationalist parties in Africa
Political parties established in 2019
Political parties in Ethiopia
Social liberal parties
Ethiopian People's Revolutionary Democratic Front